Warne may refer to:

Warne (car), British 4-wheeled cyclecar made 1913-1915
Warne (river), a river of Lower Saxony, Germany
Warne, North Carolina, an unincorporated community of North Carolina, United States
Warne, Victoria, a town in Victoria, Australia
Frederick Warne & Co, book publishers

People with the surname
Baz Warne (born 1964), English musician
Bill Warne (1914–1945), Australian rules footballer
Charles Warne (1802–1887), English antiquarian and archæologist
Colston Warne, (1900–1987), professor of economics and one of the founders of Consumers Union
Frank Warne (1906–1994), Australian cricketer
Frank Julian Warne (1874–1948), American journalist, economist and statistician
Frederick Warne (1825–1901), British publisher
George Warne (1881–1928), British politician
Helene Warne, British film editor who worked on American films during the 1920s and early 1930s
H. Rus Warne (1872–1954), American architect
Ivor Warne-Smith (1897–1960), Australian footballer
Jim Warne (1879–1958), Australian rules footballer
Jo Warne (fl. 1978–2000), British actress
John Warne (born 1979), American musician
Kate Warne (1833–1868), first female detective in the United States
Katharine Mulky Warne (1923–2015), American composer, pianist and teacher
Norman Warne (1868–1905), British publisher
Paul Warne (born 1973), English soccer player
Peter Warne (disambiguation)
Ray Warne, English professional footballer who played for Ipswich Town between 1950 and 1951
Shane Warne (1969–2022), Australian cricketer
Shelby Logan Warne (born 1993), British music producer, musician, visual artist, frontwoman of the rock group KYROS
Steve Warne (born 1984), English footballer
Tom Warne (1870–1944), Australian cricketer
Walter Warne (1898–1962), Australian politician

See also
Warn (disambiguation)
Warnes (disambiguation)

English-language surnames